Iyad Al-Yahri (Arabic:إياد اليهري) (born 3 February 1991) is a Qatari footballer. He currently plays as a midfielder .

Career
He formerly played for Al-Shamal, and Al-Bidda .

External links

References

Living people
1991 births
Qatari footballers
Al-Shamal SC players
Al Bidda SC players
Qatar Stars League players
Qatari Second Division players
Association football midfielders
Place of birth missing (living people)